Waterwijk  (also: Gemeente Waterleiding Terrain) is a neighborhood of Amsterdam, Netherlands built on the site of the Amsterdam municipal waterworks on the corner of Haarlemmerweg and Van Hallstraat in Amsterdam-West. In this neighborhood, an ecodistrict has been implemented.

In the 6-hectare neighborhood, cars may only access the parking areas for the apartment buildings from the streets that form the edges of the neighborhood; all of the inner areas of the neighborhood are car-free.

References

Amsterdam-West
Neighbourhoods of Amsterdam
Car-free zones in the Netherlands